Windermere High School is a  high school in Lake Butler, an unincorporated area located in the southwest portion of Orange County, Florida, USA, within the Orlando metropolitan area.

The school was set up as a relief school to relieve overcrowding for nearby West Orange High School. Classes began for the 2017–2018 school year.

The district established a vote for naming the school and 39% of the area's families voted for the name "Windermere High School" (with 22% each voted for "Horizon High School" and "Lake Butler High School"). The Windermere town council opposed the naming on the grounds that area residents might confuse the school with Windermere Preparatory School. Some OCPS board members also argued the school should not be named for a community in which it would not be located; they stated that not very many students from Windermere would go there.

History

A number of new schools have been built in nearby areas to serve as relief schools. Dr. Phillips High School was built in 1987 to handle student capacity in the Universal, Sand Lake and Bay Hill communities. Olympia High School was built in 2001 to handle growth in Windermere,  MetroWest, Pine Hills and some of the Dr. Phillips area. In 2005, Ocoee High School was reinstated to handle tremendous growth in the Ocoee and West Oaks Mall area. The next school in this succession is scheduled for the Horizon West area.

Lakeview Middle School, Ocoee High School and Apopka High School are already or are expected to be at capacity within 2 to 4 years. Wekiva High School Apopka High Relief opened in August 2007 to handle overflow from Apopka High School and Ocoee High School. West Orange Comprehensive Replacement itself will be at or beyond program capacity within two years.

In late 2007, the Orange County School Board was considering postponement of West Orange Relief past the anticipated 2012 opening. Given revenue shortfalls, this was a virtual certainty.

In November 2013, Orange County Commissioners rejected the proposal for a West Orange Relief School on C.R. 535 and Ficquette Road in Windermere.

In August 2014, the West Orange Relief High School had a tentative opening date of August 2017. The site is located on the intersection of Winter Garden Vineland Road and Summerport Village Parkway near County Road 535 and Ficquette Road.

By September 2015, ground had been broken and construction of the school had begun.

In October 2016, the OCPS School Board approved the name "Windermere High School" after much controversy due to the new school not being in close proximity to the town of Windermere and the Windermere council expressing its disagreement with the name. The school mascot chosen was The Wolverines, the school colors chosen were navy, bright green and silver (similar to the Seattle Seahawks American football team).

On August 14, 2017, Windermere High School opened to students.

Incidents
On September 20, 2017, the school was put on lockdown after a threat was sent by text message from two students. The school was checked and secured by local law enforcement, who forced the school into a late dismissal. No weapon or threat was found and charges against the two students were dropped.

On November 15, 2017, the school was put on lockdown again after a parent received a text message saying, "There are guys in the bathrooms and hallways with guns in Windermere High School. We are afraid, please call 911 now." The school was checked by local law enforcement and no threat was found, letting the students out in a late dismissal.

On February 16, 2018, the school was put on a brief lockdown after a threat was called in. The lockdown ended before noon.

On August 23, 2018, a student posted a threat on social media. The school did not go into lockdown and the student was arrested.

Campus
With a budget of $93.5 million, Windermere High School had 2,800 students in its first year. It now has 4,000 students.

Communities served
The school serves: sections of Lake Butler, the Orange County portion of Four Corners, and Bay Lake.

References

External links
 "West Orange County Relief High School." Orange County Public Schools Board of Zoning Adjustment. September 6, 2013.
 "Windermere High School". Wharton-Smith Inc Construction Group.

High schools in Florida
2017 establishments in Florida
Educational institutions established in 2017